Aktuellt (literally "current; topical" or "actual") is a Swedish nightly news programme produced by Sveriges Television (SVT) and broadcast on its second channel, SVT2 in Sweden.

It was first broadcast on 2 September 1958. With the start of TV 2 (forerunner of SVT2) in 1969, the Aktuellt brand disappeared but was revived in 1972 when TV1 began airing two main bulletins at 6pm and 9pm. The 6pm bulletin was  moved to SVT2 in 1997, followed on 15 January 2001 by the 9pm edition. The year before, editorial responsibility for Aktuellt, Rapport (SVT1's news programme), and SVT's news channel, SVT24, was unified; nevertheless, the name "Aktuellt" continues to be used to designate SVT2's news programmes.

A relaunch of Aktuellt in November 2007 saw Rapport begin a 6pm bulletin on SVT1 while the sole 9pm Aktuellt programme relaunched as an in-depth news and current affairs programme, covering two of three main items in detail. On 5 March 2012, the programme was extended to 60 minutes and now incorporates sports updates, regional news opt-outs & a news summary. The programme is now co-anchored by a rotating team of presenters - Anna Hedenmo, Jon Nilsson, Claes Elfsberg and Cecilia Gralde. Carina Bergfeldt is their foreign reporter.

In 2015 Mona Walter criticized Aktuellt for censoring a segment about an incident in Rinkeby.

References

External links
Aktuellt's homepage at SVT.se

Sveriges Television original programming
Swedish television news shows
1950s Swedish television series
1960s Swedish television series
1970s Swedish television series
1980s Swedish television series
1990s Swedish television series
2000s Swedish television series
2010s Swedish television series
2020s Swedish television series